Renaldo Rijkhoff is a Dutch mixed martial artist.

Mixed martial arts record

|-
| Loss
| align=center| 2-3
| Patrick de Witte
| TKO
| FFH: Free Fight Explosion 1
| 
| align=center| 0
| align=center| 0:00
| Beverwijk, North Holland, Netherlands
| 
|-
| Loss
| align=center| 2-2
| Sander MacKilljan
| KO (punch)
| Rings Holland: Di Capo Di Tutti Capi
| 
| align=center| 1
| align=center| 1:50
| Utrecht, Netherlands
| 
|-
| Loss
| align=center| 2-1
| Peter Verschuren
| KO (knee)
| Rings Holland: There Can Only Be One Champion
| 
| align=center| 1
| align=center| 3:13
| Utrecht, Netherlands
| 
|-
| Win
| align=center| 2-0
| Rick Holshuizen
| KO (punch)
| Rings Holland: The Kings of the Magic Ring
| 
| align=center| 2
| align=center| 1:12
| Utrecht, Netherlands
| 
|-
| Win
| align=center| 1-0
| Fred de Weerd
| KO
| FFH: Free Fight Gala
| 
| align=center| 0
| align=center| 0:00
| Beverwijk, North Holland, Netherlands
|

See also
List of male mixed martial artists

References

1974 births
Living people
Dutch male mixed martial artists
Sportspeople from Amsterdam